Paramarthalingapuram is a village in Tamil Nadu, India located near the town of Kanyakumari.

Villages in Kanyakumari district